This is a list of governors of the Austrian state of Upper Austria:

See also
Upper Austria

List
Upper Austria
Governors